The Tour of the Basque Country (Officially: Itzulia Basque Country) is an annual road cycling stage race held in the Spanish Basque Country in April. It is one of the races that make up the UCI World Tour calendar. As the Basque Country is a mountainous area, there are few flat stages, and thus the event favors those who are strong climbers. The race is characterized by its short stages, rarely exceeding 200 km, and steep ascents. While the ascents featured in the race aren't particularly high compared to other stage races, they are among the steepest seen in professional cycling, some having sections with gradients reaching well above 20%.

History
The original Tour of the Basque Country had a troubled history, with eight editions contested between 1924 and 1935, before the civil war seemingly wiped it out for good. One of these early editions is commentated on in Ernest Hemingway's novel The Sun Also Rises.

In 1952, the Eibar Cycling Club (erstwhile backers of Spain's first national stage race, the pre-Vuelta a España Gran Premio República) launched a new 3-day event called Gran Premio de la Bicicleta Eibarresa to celebrate its 25th anniversary. Former French national champion Louis Caput took the inaugural edition.

In 1969, organizers opted to promote the race (by then five stages long) as IX Vuelta al País Vasco - XVIII Bicicleta Eibarresa, effectively merging the Bicicleta Eibarresa into a reborn Tour of the Basque Country. However, the palmares of the Bicicleta Eibarresa (featuring Vuelta a España winners Jesús Loroño and Rolf Wolfshohl) is not recognized as part of the Tour of the Basque Country's history. The Eibar Cycling Club would relinquish control of the competition following the 1973 edition, while retaining the rights to the Bicicleta Eibarresa name, which has sporadically been reactivated to help promote other, lower ranked events.

The first winner of the Tour of the Basque Country was Francis Pélissier from France, while the first winner of the 'modern' Tour (1969) was Jacques Anquetil, also of France. The most successful riders in the history of the Tour are Spain's José Antonio González, who won the race four times in 1972, 1975, 1977 and 1978, and Spain's Alberto Contador, who also won the race four times in 2008, 2009, 2014 and 2016.  Since its revival in 1969, it has been held every year with the exception of 2020 due to the COVID-19 pandemic.

From 2022, the race has a counterpart in the UCI Women's World Tour - the Itzulia Women. 

The winner traditionally dons a basque beret on the podium.

Winners
Source:

Multiple winners

Most stage wins

References

External links
 

 
Recurring sporting events established in 1924
UCI ProTour races
Cycle races in the Basque Country
UCI World Tour races
1924 establishments in the Basque Country (autonomous community)